Hillcrest School is a secondary school for girls (and mixed sixth form) located in the Bartley Green area of Birmingham, in the West Midlands of England.

History
It was established as Bartley Green Grammar School for Girls on 7 September 1954, although the official opening by Sir Wilfred Martineau did not take place until 13 July 1955. The sixth form was opened by the end of the 1950s. The school was considerably extended and expanded in the 1970s to accommodate with the increase in pupil intake.

The school was renamed Hillcrest School in September 1983 and became a comprehensive school. Boys were allowed to join the sixth form during the 1980s. Following further work at the school in 1998, the school became a Certified Cisco Networking Academy in 1999. The school also became a specialist Maths and Computing College.

Previously a community school administered by Birmingham City Council, Hillcrest School converted to academy status in June 2013. However the school continues to coordinate with Birmingham City Council for admissions. In 2013 Ofsted rated the school as 'good' with 'outstanding behaviour and safety'.

Academics
Hillcrest School GCSEs and BTECs as programmes of study for girls, while students in the sixth form have the option to study from a range of A-levels and further BTECs. The sixth form provision is offered as part of the Oaks Sixth Form College, a consortium of 7 secondary schools in South-West Birmingham.

Notable former pupils

Bartley Green Grammar School for Girls
Lynne Jones, Labour Party politician

References

External links
Hillcrest School official website

Secondary schools in Birmingham, West Midlands
Girls' schools in the West Midlands (county)
Educational institutions established in 1954
1954 establishments in England
Academies in Birmingham, West Midlands